The Polaris Slingshot is a three-wheeled motorcycle. The first edition of the model was introduced in 2014 as a 2015 model.

Specifications 

The Slingshot has a tilt-adjustable steering wheel, side-by-side bucket seats, and does not lean. It has no roof, doors, or side windows and the whole interior is waterproof so it can be hosed down and drained out using drain holes in the floor.

The S and SL models come with a 20" x 9.0" back rim fitted with a 255mm width tire, and 18" x 7.5" front rims with 225mm wide tires.  The SLR and R models have the same front rims and tires with the addition of a 20" x 11.0" rear rim fitted with a 305mm wide tire.  All models have a front double wishbone suspension with anti-roll bar. An optional 5-speed automatic transmission became available in 2020 with the release of the generation two models. A small windshield is an optional extra on the base model, and fitted as standard on the SL model. There is also an optional fiberglass wind and sun cover, which Polaris calls a "Slingshade", that features inset polycarbonate windows and snaps onto the Slingshot's tube frame, acting somewhat like a hardtop roof. The steering wheel, gear stick, and brake, clutch, and throttle pedals have a conventional automobile layout.

Classification 
Depending on jurisdiction, the Slingshot may be registered as a motorcycle or as an autocycle. It is classified as an autocycle in 44 states. Three-point seat belts are fitted; however, it has no airbags or crumple zone, and in certain jurisdictions the driver and passenger must wear motorcycle helmets.

Performance 

Beginning with the 2020 model year, the Slingshot is powered by a 2.0 liter inline four-cylinder gasoline-powered Polaris ProStar Engine that produces 203 hp (151 kW) at 8250 RPM and 144 lb-ft (195 N•m) of torque at 6500 RPM.  It can be fitted to either a conventional 5-speed manual, or an AutoDrive 5-speed automated manual transmission, which is the first time an automatic transmission has been made available on the Slingshot. This transmission is essentially the same standard 5-speed synchromesh-equipped manual gearbox, but the clutch and shifting are hydraulically actuated, and computer-controlled. The interior was also redesigned and the exterior updated. For the 2015 to 2019 model years, the Slingshot was powered by a GM-sourced 2.4 liter Ecotec inline four that produced 173 hp (129 kW) at 6200 RPM and 166 lb-ft (225 N⋅m) of torque at 4700 RPM.

See also 
 Campagna T-Rex, another 3-wheeled vehicle
 List of motorized trikes
 Microlino
 Nobe GT100
 Elio Motors
 Three-wheeler

References

External links 

 Polaris Slingshot

Three-wheeled motor vehicles
Vehicles introduced in 2014